Glacier Peak Wilderness is a , ,  wilderness area  located within portions of Chelan, Snohomish, and Skagit counties in the North Cascades of Washington. The area lies within parts of Wenatchee National Forest and Mount Baker National Forest and is characterized by heavily forested stream courses, steep-sided valleys, and dramatic glacier-crowned peaks. The dominant geologic feature of the area is  Glacier Peak. It is the most remote major volcanic peak in the Cascade Range and has more active glaciers than any other place in the lower forty-eight states. Glacier Peak is a volcanic cone of basalt, pumice, and ash which erupted during periods of heavy glaciation.

History
Glacier Peak Wilderness was created by the U.S. Forest Service in 1960 through the efforts of the North Cascades Conservation Council, four years before the 1964 wilderness legislation of the Congress.

Ecology 

Forest vegetation comprises several species of fir, Douglas fir, hemlock, red cedar as well as stands of mixed pine and Douglas fir on its eastern slopes. Various species of wildlife inhabit the area and include deer, elk, black bear, mountain goat, cougar, marten, and lynx. Smaller animals, such as field mice are common. The last confirmed grizzly bear sighting in the United States portion of the North Cascade ecosystem occurred in this wilderness.  The high mountain lakes often give good catches of fish during their ice-free months. The primary fishery is cutthroat trout, however, other species do exist.

Access 

No roads approach Glacier Peak, and many miles of hiking through extremely rough terrain to reach its base. Normally, hikers can reach the volcano from the west via the White Chuck River Valley, or the Suiattle River Valley; from the east, it may be approached from the western tip of Lake Chelan or the White River or Chiwawa River valleys.

Trail conditions 
Most years the wilderness is still buried under  of snow in May. Usually most trails and passes are snow free by mid-August, but this varies from year to year. Snow and cold rain can occur in mid-summer.

See also 
 Dome Peak
 Image Lake
 Ptarmigan Traverse
 Encounters with the Archdruid

References

External links

Glacier Peak Wilderness (Okanogan-Wenatchee National Forest) U.S. Forest Service
Glacier Peak Wilderness (Mt. Baker-Snoqualmie National Forest) U.S. Forest Service
Glacier Peak Wilderness Wilderness.net (The University of Montana)

Cascade Range
Protected areas of Chelan County, Washington
IUCN Category Ib
Protected areas of Skagit County, Washington
Protected areas of Snohomish County, Washington
Wilderness areas of Washington (state)
North Cascades of Washington (state)
North Cascades National Park
Mount Baker-Snoqualmie National Forest
Wenatchee National Forest